See What Tomorrow Brings is the fifth studio album by the American folk music trio Peter, Paul & Mary, released in 1965 (see 1965 in music).

Track listing 

Side one
 "If I Were Free" (Travis  Edmonson) - 2:43
 "Betty & Dupree" (Adapted and arranged by Peter Yarrow, Noel "Paul" Stookey, Mary Travers, Milton Okun) - 3:13
 "The Rising of the Moon" (John Keegan "Leo" Casey Adapted and arranged by Peter Yarrow, Noel "Paul" Stookey, Mary Travers, Milton Okun) - 3:36
 "Early Mornin' Rain" - (Gordon Lightfoot) - 3:13
 "Jane, Jane" - (Adapted and arranged by Peter Yarrow, Noel "Paul" Stookey, Mary Travers, Milton Okun) - 2:57
 "Because All Men Are Brothers" (Johann Sebastian Bach, Tom Glazer) - 2:17

Side two
 "Hangman" - (Adapted and arranged by Peter Yarrow, Joel Hendler, Noel "Paul" Stookey, Mary Travers, Milton Okun) - 2:51
 "Brother, (Buddy) Can You Spare a Dime?" (Jay Gorney, E.Y. "Yip" Harburg) - 2:29
 "The First Time Ever I Saw Your Face" (Ewan MacColl) - 3:06
 "Tryin' to Win" (Brownie McGhee, Sonny Terry) - 2:33
 "On a Desert Island (With You in My Dreams)" (Noel "Paul" Stookey, Richard Kniss) - 1:46
 "The Last Thing on My Mind" (Tom Paxton) - 2:43

Personnel
Peter Yarrow – vocals, guitar
Noel "Paul" Stookey – vocals, guitar
Mary Travers – vocals
Technical
Harry Yarmack - recording engineer
Barry Feinstein - photography

Chart positions

Notes 

Peter, Paul and Mary albums
1965 albums
Warner Records albums
Albums produced by Albert Grossman